Robert C. Shelton Jr. (born April 14, 1934) is an American politician who served in the New Jersey General Assembly from the 15th Legislative District from 1974 to 1976.

References

1934 births
Living people
Democratic Party members of the New Jersey General Assembly
Politicians from Sussex County, New Jersey